Pelodiaetus is a genus of ground beetles in the family Carabidae. There are at least two described species in Pelodiaetus, found in New Zealand.

Species
These two species belong to the genus Pelodiaetus:
 Pelodiaetus nunni Sokolov, 2019
 Pelodiaetus sulcatipennis Jeannel, 1937

References

External links

 

Trechinae